Gizrra, or Toga, is a Papuan language of New Guinea. Its two varieties are Western Gizrra and Waidoro.

References

Eastern Trans-Fly languages
Torres Strait
Languages of Western Province (Papua New Guinea)